Izvaryne is a railway station that is located in a town of Izvaryne, Krasnodon city, Luhansk Oblast in Ukraine. It is part of the Luhansk administration (Donetsk Railways).

The station is an important transportation gateway to Ukraine. The station serves freight and local passengers trains. Among the services provided at the station is only embarkment and disembarkment of passengers for commuter lines.

External links
 Izvaryne railway station

!Previous station!!!!Operator!!!!Next Station

Railway stations in Luhansk Oblast
Russia–Ukraine border crossings
Krasnodon